Jian Tao (born 22 June 2001) is a Chinese footballer who plays as a goalkeeper.

Club career
Born in Guangyuan, Sichuan, Jian started his career with the Chengdu Derui football training school in 2012. He was scouted by the Chengdu Football Association, and joined the representative team in 2013. In 2018 he began training with French Ligue 1 side Olympique Lyonnais, and signed officially the following year. 

After a year and a half with Lyon, Jian moved to satellite club Villefranche Beaujolais. However, after only one appearance for the club, coming off the bench in a 12–0 Coupe de France win over US Mozac, he was released by the club in July 2022. Since his release, he has trained with Chinese Super League side Chengdu Rongcheng in January 2023.

International career
Jian has represented China from under-15 to under-21 level.

Career statistics

Club

Notes

References

2001 births
Living people
People from Guangyuan
Footballers from Sichuan
Chinese footballers
China youth international footballers
Association football goalkeepers
Olympique Lyonnais players
FC Villefranche Beaujolais players
Chinese expatriate footballers
Chinese expatriate sportspeople in France
Expatriate footballers in France